Ek Phool Char Kante is a 1960 Hindi film directed by Bhappi Sonie in his directorial debut. The film stars Sunil Dutt, Waheeda Rehman, Johnny Walker, Gopi and Tun Tun. The film's music is by Shankar Jaikishan.

The film included the famous songs "Beautiful Baby of Broadway", "Bombshell Baby of Bombay" sang by (Iqbal Singh Sethi) and Matwali Naar Thumak Thumak Chali Jaaye".

The Salman Khan, Karishma Kapoor-starrer Dulhan Hum Le Jayenge is thematically similar to this film. The story of Ek Phool Char Kante was inspired by Susanna Centlivre's play A Bold Stroke for a Wife.

Plot
The film is a light-hearted comic love story, wherein Sunil Dutt falls in love with a "phool" Sushma(Waheeda Rehman) but has to impress her four uncles, the "kante" (thorns) of the title. Each uncle has a different idiosyncrasy and Sunil Dutt pretends to be an expert in that field in order to impress that particular uncle. First Uncle Dhumal a religious fanatic he pretends as a religious scholar (Vidyartthi). Second Uncle David an acting fanatic he impresses as a versatile Actor. The four uncles select their protégé for their niece, not knowing that each is selecting the same boy. When the boy whom they have approved disappears, they agree to marry their niece off to her choice, who is Sunil Dutt again.

Cast
 Sunil Dutt as Sanjeev
 Waheeda Rehman as Sushma
Krishan Dhawan as Shyam ( Sanjeev s friend)
 Mohan Choti as Sanjeevs house servant.
 Tun Tun as Jamuna ( Sushmas Caretaker)
 Sulochana Latkar 
 Bir Sakuja  as Sanjeevs father
 Iqbal Singh Sethi 
 Mumtaz Begum as Sanjeev"s mother
 David Abraham as Uncle No 1 (cinema fanatic)
 Johnny Walker as Uncle  - 2 (rock n roll fanatic)
 Rashid Khan as Uncle - 3 (yoga fanatic)
 Dhumal as Uncle - 4 (religious fanatic)
Bela Bose as Sushma s friend
Bindu as Sushma s friend

Soundtrack

References

External links 
 

1960 films
1960s Hindi-language films
Films scored by Shankar–Jaikishan
1960 directorial debut films
Films directed by Bhappi Sonie